This is a complete list of the operas of the Italian composer Riccardo Zandonai (1883–1944).

List

References

Waterhouse, John C. G. (1992), "Zandonai, Riccardo" in The New Grove Dictionary of Opera, ed. Stanley Sadie (London) 

 
Lists of operas by composer
Lists of compositions by composer